The BTR-94 is a Ukrainian amphibious armoured personnel carrier (Bronetransporter), a modification of the Soviet eight-wheeled BTR-80.

Description 
The BTR-94's turret BAU-23x2 is larger than the BTR-80's BPU-1. It is fitted with a twin 23x152mm gun 2A7M with 200 rounds, a coaxial KT-7.62 machine gun with 2,000 rounds, six 81 mm smoke grenade launchers and a combined 1PZ-7-23 optical sight. 

Each 2A7M gun has a max. rate of fire of 850 rds/min. The same gun is mounted on the ZSU-23-4. The BAU-23x2 module can be mounted on other armoured vehicles like the BTR-70 or Ratel IFV.

Operators

Current operators
  - Iraq received 50 BTR-94's donated by Jordan in 2004 for use by the Mechanized Police Brigade.

Former operators
  - Jordan ordered 50 BTR-94's in 1999, the last vehicles were delivered in February 2000.

See also 
 BTR-152
 BTR-60, BTR-70, BTR-80, BTR-90, BTR-3, BTR-4

References

External links 

 BTR-94 at Ukrspetsexport
 BTR-94 at GlobalSecurity.org
 Morozov's site about BAU-23
 Development of Ukrainian armour

Amphibious armoured personnel carriers
Wheeled armoured personnel carriers
Armoured personnel carriers of Ukraine
BTR-80
Eight-wheeled vehicles
Military vehicles introduced in the 1990s
Armoured personnel carriers of the post–Cold War period
Wheeled amphibious armoured fighting vehicles